Gunavanthudu() is a 1975 Indian Telugu film directed by Adurthi Subba Rao starring Sobhan Babu, Manjula, Kantha Rao and Anjali Devi in the lead roles. The film was released on 14 November 1975.

Cast
 Sobhan Babu 
 Manjula
 Kantha Rao
 Anjali Devi 
 Dhulipala
 Krishna Kumari
 Mada
 Jayamalini
Prabhakar Reddy

Reception
Gunavantudu had one of the biggest opening for any Telugu film at the time of its release thanks to the huge success of actor Sobhan Babu's previous films released in 1975. The film garnered highly negative reviews from both critics and audience. Yet the film managed to make good profit and was declared a Hit at the box office. It was, however, the lowest grossing Sobhan Babu film of the year 1975.

References

External links

1975 films
1975 drama films
Indian drama films
Films scored by K. V. Mahadevan
1970s Telugu-language films
Films directed by Adurthi Subba Rao